Jakob Kinau (28 August 1884 – 14 December 1965) was a German sailor, sergeant of the Imperial German Navy, writer, publisher and customs officer.

Background and education 
Jakob Kinau was born to a fisherman Heinrich Wilhelm Kinau and his wife, Metta Holst. His brothers, the writer Gorch Fock, alias Johann Kinau and Rudolf Kinau. Kinau attended the elementary school and then a naval school, later in a customs school. He was in the deep sea fishing in the North Sea worked and acquired the patent as a captain on Kleiner Fahrt. His military service he rendered in the Imperial Navy. He later worked at the Hamburg water tariff.

In World War 
From 1916 to 1918, he was as Minenbootsmannsmaat on the auxiliary cruiser SMS Wolf (1913) embarked. The experiences of this trip, he processed in his literary work Adjutant des Todes. Wolfs-Tagebuch, which appeared in 1934 in Hamburg Quickborn-Verlag.

Literary activity 
After the end of the war, Kinau became a customs officer again; His last rank was customs inspector. From 1920 to 1934 he was president of the union of water customs officials of the German Reich. From 1924 to 1944 he was literary and editor-in-chief; his works dealt exclusively with issues of seafaring. In 1925 he published the complete works of his brother Gorch Fock. 1939/40 he published four dime novels in the series War Library of the German youth, by the High Command of the Navy has been funded for propaganda purposes. In 1950 his late work Leegerwall as continued calls from the lake.

Works 
 Die See ruft, Hamburg 1924
 Freie Wasser, Hamburg 1926
 Adjutant des Todes, Hamburg 1934
 Gorch Fock, München 1935
 Freibeuter, Hamburg 1938
 Der Kampf um die Seeherrschaft von der Hanse bis zum Weltkrieg, München 1938
 Den Göttern aus der Hand gesprungen, Hamburg 1939
 Durchbruch nach Oslo, Berlin 1940
 Mit Käppen Jonas auf U-Bootjagd, Berlin 1940
 Vorpostenboot "Seehund", Berlin 1940
 Der Tiger der Fjorde, Berlin 1941
 Undeichbar Land, Hamburg 1942
 Leegerwall, Hamburg 1950
 Upwussen an de Elv, Hamburg 2003 (with Gorch Fock and Rudolf Kinau)

Editorship 
 Gorch Fock: Sämtliche Werke, Hamburg
 1 (1925)
 2 (1925)
 3 (1925)
 4 (1925)
 5 (1925)
 Gorch Fock: Ein Schiff! Ein Schwert! Ein Segel!, München 1934 (edited with Marie Luise Droop)
 Gorch Fock: Seefahrt ist not!, Hamburg 1944 (edited with Maria Kinau)

Further reading 
 Deutsches Literatur-Lexikon. Biographisch-Bibliographisches Handbuch, 3. Aufl. Bern 1981, S. 1163.
 Werner Schuder (ed.): Kürschners Deutscher Literatur-Kalender. Nekrolog 1936–1970, Berlin/New York 1973, S. 339.
 Peter Wanjek: Bibliographie der deutschen Heftromane 1900–1945, Wilfersdorf 1993, S. 293f.
 Anhang: Besatzungsliste des Hilfskreuzers "Wolf", in Fritz Witschetzky: Das schwarze Schiff, Stuttgart 1926, nach S. 320 [Kinau ist als Nr. 303 in der Liste aufgeführt].

Literature on Jacob Kinau 
 Reinhard Goltz: "Der Gott der Heimat, der beste Kamerad und der geschaßte Gewerkschafter. Die Schriftsteller Johann, Rudolf und Jakob Kinau in der Nazi-Zeit", in: Niederdeutsch im Nationalsozialismus. Studien zur Rolle regionaler Kultur im Faschismus / hrsg. von Kay Dohnke, Norbert Hopster und Jan Wirrer, Hildesheim u.a. 1994, S. 342-386.

External links 
 Biographische Angaben at kinau-haus.de

1884 births
1965 deaths
20th-century German novelists
Military personnel from Hamburg
Tax collectors
Writers from Hamburg
German military writers
Imperial German Navy personnel of World War I
German male poets
20th-century German poets
20th-century German male writers
German male non-fiction writers